Clay Cross & Danesmoor Welfare F.C. was an English football club, based in Clay Cross, Derbyshire.

History
They reached the third qualifying round of the FA Cup in 1957.

Records
FA Cup
 3rd qualifying round – 1956–57

References

Defunct football clubs in Derbyshire
Defunct football clubs in England